Chris Miller (born July 10, 1973) is a former American football wide receiver in the Arena Football League who played for the Buffalo Destroyers. He played college football for the USC Trojans. He also played in NFL Europe for the Scottish Claymores.

He is a cousin of Keyshawn Johnson and the two were teammates at USC.

References

1973 births
Living people
American football wide receivers
Buffalo Destroyers players
Scottish Claymores players
USC Trojans football players
Players of American football from Los Angeles